I'm from the Country is the fifth studio album by American country music artist Tracy Byrd. Released in May 1998 as his final studio album for MCA Records, it produced only two singles: the title track and "I Wanna Feel That Way Again", both of which reached Top Ten on the Billboard Hot Country Singles & Tracks (now Hot Country Songs) charts that year, peaking at #3 and #9, respectively. "I'm from the Country" was co-written by Richard Young, rhythm guitarist for the band The Kentucky Headhunters. The album was originally to be titled Walkin' the Line.

Track listing

Personnel
 Mike Brignardello - bass guitar
 Tracy Byrd - lead vocals
 Larry Byrom - bass guitar, acoustic guitar, electric guitar
 Johnny Lee Carpenter - fiddle
 Mark Casstevens - acoustic guitar
 Glen Duncan - fiddle 
 Stuart Duncan - fiddle 
 Paul Franklin - fiddle, steel guitar
 Steve Gibson - electric guitar
 Owen Hale - drums
 Brent Mason - electric guitar
 Steve Nathan - keyboards, piano
 Tom Roady - percussion
 John Wesley Ryles - background vocals
 Scotty Sanders - steel guitar
 Randy Scruggs - acoustic guitar, electric guitar
 Harry Stinson - tambourine, background vocals
 Billy Thomas - background vocals
 Robby Turner - steel guitar
 Lonnie Wilson - drums, keyboards
 Glenn Worf - bass guitar

Charts

Weekly charts

Year-end charts

References

1998 albums
Albums produced by Tony Brown (record producer)
Tracy Byrd albums
MCA Records albums